Jamiroquai are a British funk and acid jazz band formed in 1992. Fronted by lead singer Jay Kay, Jamiroquai were initially the most prominent component in the early-1990s London-based acid jazz movement. Subsequent albums have explored other musical directions such as pop, rock, disco and electronica. Their best-known track is "Virtual Insanity", which won four awards at the 1997 MTV Video Music Awards. Jamiroquai have sold more than 26 million albums worldwide and won a Grammy Award in 1998.

Albums

Studio albums

Compilation albums

Video albums

Singles

Notes

References

Discography
Discographies of British artists
Rock music group discographies
Pop music group discographies
Funk music discographies